Quality Group Limited is Tanzania's largest conglomerate with 17 companies in the automotive, engineering products, international trade, logistic solutions and warehousing, real estate development, food processing, consulting, transport, aluminium and fisheries sectors. It is a privately held company owned by the ABC family.

Companies of Tanzania